Lunapark was the debut album by indie rock band Luna. It was released in 1992 on Elektra Records. As the first musical outing of Dean Wareham since the disbanding of Galaxie 500, Lunapark set forth the new musical directions of Wareham and embraced a musical sound that would continue to evolve throughout Luna's tenure. Originally recorded as a three-piece, Luna did not add guitarist Sean Eden to the lineup until 1993's Slide EP.

Track listing
All lyrics by Dean Wareham, music by Luna.
 "Slide"  – 4:19
 "Anesthesia"  – 3:40
 "Slash Your Tires"  – 4:46
 "Crazy People"  – 3:35
 "Time"  – 2:04
 "Smile"  – 3:05
 "I Can't Wait"  – 2:42
 "Hey Sister"  – 3:41
 "I Want Everything"  – 4:25
 "Time to Quit"  – 3:04
 "Goodbye"  – 2:25
 "We're Both Confused"  – 3:54

Personnel
Luna
 Dean Wareham – guitars, vocals
 Justin Harwood – bass, backing vocals
 Stanley Demeski – drums, percussion
with:
 Grasshopper – electric guitar on "Slide", "Hey Sister" and "I Want Everything"
 Mark Kramer – piano on "I Want Everything", Hammond Organ on "We're Both Confused"
 David Kleiler – electric guitar on "Time to Quit"
 Sara T. Walker – backing vocals on "Smile''
 Fred Maher – acoustic guitar on "We're Both Confused"
Technical
 Fred Maher – producer
 Lloyd Puckitt – engineer
 Susanne Dyer – assistant engineer

References

Luna (1990s American band) albums
1992 debut albums
Elektra Records albums